Acrotrema is a genus of flowering plants in the family Dilleniaceae. It is found in South Asia in India, Malaysia, Myanmar, Sri Lanka, and Thailand.

Species

 Acrotrema agastyamalayanum E.S.S.Kumar, Dan & G.M.Nair
 Acrotrema arnottianum Wight
 Acrotrema costatum Jack
 Acrotrema dissectum Thwaites
 Acrotrema intermedium Thwaites
 Acrotrema lanceolatum Hook.
 Acrotrema lyratum Thwaites
 Acrotrema thwaitesii Hook.f. & Thomson
 Acrotrema uniflorum Hook.
 Acrotrema walkeri Wight ex Thwaites

References

Dilleniaceae
Eudicot genera